The Street Song or The Streetsweeper (German: Gassenhauer) is a 1931 German musical crime film directed by Lupu Pick and starring Ina Albrecht, Ernst Busch and Albert Hoermann. The film was shot at the Grunewald Studios. It is a Berlin-set film, with sets designed by art director Robert Neppach. It premiered at the Gloria-Palast in the German capital. The film was a considerable public success and one of its songs, "Marie, Marie," by the Comedian Harmonists, became a hit record. A separate French-language version, The Four Vagabonds, was also made.

Cast
 Ina Albrecht as Marie  
 Ernst Busch as Peter  
 Albert Hoermann as Paul  
 Hans Deppe as Max  
 Martin Jacob as Emil  
 Wolfgang Staudte as Gustav  
 Karl Hannemann as Hausverwalter Nowack 
 Margarete Schön as Emma  
 Willi Schaeffers as Impresario  
 Werner Hollmann as Untersuchungsrichter  
 Werner Pledath as Kommisar  
 Rudolf Biebrach as Aufseher 
 Hans Leibelt as Kriminalinspektor  
 María Dalbaicín as Taenzerin  
 Michael von Newlinsky as Tänzer  
 Rudolf Blümner as Mann am Telefon 
 Comedian Harmonists as Themselves 
 Gustav Püttjer
 Albert Florath

References

External links 
 

1931 films
1931 crime films
1931 musical films
German crime films
German musical films
Films of the Weimar Republic
1930s German-language films
Films directed by Lupu Pick
Films about musical groups
Films set in Berlin
Films set in the 1900s
Social realism in film
German multilingual films
German black-and-white films
1931 multilingual films
1930s German films